The following is a list of notable events and releases of the year 1909 in Norwegian music.

Events

Deaths

 December
 4 – Christian Teilman (66), organist, pianist, and composer.

Births

 February
 10 – Peter L. Rypdal, fiddler and traditional folk music composer (died 1988).

 October
 18 – Jan Wølner, classical pianist (died 1991).

 December
 3 – Øivind Bergh, violinist and orchestral leader (died 1987).

See also
 1909 in Norway
 Music of Norway

References

 
Norwegian music
Norwegian
Music
1900s in Norwegian music